Appleton Roebuck is a village and civil parish in the Selby district of North Yorkshire, England. It had a population of 692 according to the 2001 census, increasing to 792 in the 2011 census and including Acaster Selby.

In February 2000 much of Appleton Roebuck was designated a Conservation Area under Section 69 of the Planning (Listed Buildings and Conservation Areas) Act 1990, and consists of 18th- and 19th-century buildings. There are six listed buildings within the Conservation Area, all Grade II, including two places of worship.

History

Appleton Roebuck derives its name from the Anglo-Saxon meaning a farm where apple trees grew and, from the fourteenth century, when it was owned by a man called Rabuk.

Appleton Roebuck is mentioned in the Domesday Book demonstrating that it was already settled before the Norman Conquest. In the 12th century a nunnery was established at Nun Appleton, a short distance from the village. It was founded by Adeliza, or Alice de St. Quintin, in the reign of King Stephen. After the Dissolution of the Monasteries, the site was acquired by the Fairfax family.  A house was built there which later became the home of Thomas, the third Lord Fairfax, a parliamentary commander during the Civil War. After the death of Mary Fairfax, Duchess of Buckingham, Nun Appleton was eventually sold in about 1711 to Alderman Milner of Leeds. The Milner family, who made their money from the Aire and Calder Navigation Canal, continued to own the Hall until 1875, when it was leased to William Beckett Dennison. As the agricultural depression of the 19th century and competition from railways increased, the Milner fortune dwindled away and the estate was sold. The manor and estate originally belonged to the Latimer family, passing, by way of his daughter Elizabeth, to John, Lord Neville of Raby during the reign of Richard II. The estate and manor stayed in the Neville family until 1426.

Woolas Hall, now a farmhouse, was once a more important building, as indicated by the moat by which it was surrounded and may still be traced in the landscape around it.

Governance

The village lies within the UK Parliamentary Constituency of Selby and Ainsty. As of the 2010 UK general election, the seat is represented by Nigel Adams of the Conservative Party, with a majority of 12,265. The village is in the Appleton Roebuck ward of Selby District Council. As of 2010, it is represented by Richard Musgrave of the local Conservative Party. The village was once part of the Parish of Bolton Percy, but is now a civil parish in its own right and includes the nearby village of Acaster Selby. There are eight councillors of which seven come from Appleton Roebuck. The population of this ward taken at the 2011 Census was 1,865.

Demography

In 1822 the population was 585. This rose in 1872 to 622 and according to the census of 1881 was 441.

The 2011 census recorded the population as 792.

Economy

The village is in a mostly agricultural area, though many residents work in the nearby cities and towns. Within the village are two public houses and various small businesses. Both public houses are Samuel Smith pubs – The Shoulder of Mutton and The Roebuck.

Geography

The village is located in the vale of a rivulet called The Fleet. The nearest settlements are Colton,  to the north, Bolton Percy,  to the south-west, Acaster Selby,  to the south-east and Acaster Malbis,  to the north-east.

Transport

Harrogate Coach Travel operate the only public bus service that serves the village as part of the York Foss Islands to Colton route.

Education

The school was built in 1817 and an Infant school was added in 1841. As of 2010, primary education is provided by North Yorkshire County Council at Appleton Roebuck Primary School. The school is in the catchment area of Tadcaster Grammar School, a co-educational Comprehensive School, for their secondary education.

Religious sites

The Wesleyans built a Methodist chapel in the village in 1818. All Saints church was built in 1868, by J.B. & W. Atkinson.

Sports

The Tennis Club in the village fields one Men's side, two Ladies sides and four mixed sides in the Tyke Petroleum Tennis League.

Landmarks

Nun Appleton Hall was listed as Grade II on 4 July 1952. It stands in an extensive wooded park, near the confluence of the rivers Ouse and Wharfe. The house was built by Thomas, Lord Fairfax, on the site of a Cistercian priory for nuns, founded by Alice de St. Quintin at the commencement of the thirteenth century

A short distance east from the village are the remains of a moated manor site known as Brocket Hall. Brocket Hall has been cited as being one of the best preserved examples in North Yorkshire and, as such, has been made a scheduled ancient monument. It is included within the Appleton Roebuck Conservation Area.

Gallery

References

External links

 

Civil parishes in North Yorkshire
Selby District
Villages in North Yorkshire